The Soul Divas Tour was a co-headlining concert tour by American recording artists Dionne Warwick, Natalie Cole and Whitney Houston. The tour was a one-month trek that started on July 7, in Hamburg, Germany. The tour was created and initiated by Felix Scheuerpflug and the team of the Welldone Agency. The exclusive promoter was Tchibo. Tickets were available on Tchibo.de only. Houston, who was featured as the main headliner, also toured Thailand, Hong Kong, and China without Cole and Warwick, adding a few more dates through late July.

This marked the first time the three singers embarked on a tour together. Highlights of the tour, included duets with Warwick and Houston, also Cole and Houston duet on Cole's number-one R&B hit "This Will Be". After Whitney's set, all three ladies would appear together to sing Warwick's worldwide hit, "That's What Friends Are For". At the time of the tour, entertainment media mentioned that the tour would arrive in North America, but was soon postponed until further notice.

Set list
Dionne Warwick
"They Long to Be Close to You"
"Walk On By"
"Anyone Who Had a Heart"
"This Girl's in Love with You"
"I Say a Little Prayer"
"What the World Needs Now Is Love"
"I'll Never Love This Way Again"
"Heartbreaker"
Natalie Cole
"Tell Me All About It"
"What a Diff'rence a Day Made"
"The Very Thought of You"
"Unforgettable"
"Miss You Like Crazy"
"Mr. Melody"
"I've Got Love on My Mind"
"This Will Be"
Whitney Houston
"If I Told You That"
"Get It Back"
"You Light Up My Life"
Medley: "Saving All My Love for You" / "The Greatest Love of All" / "All at Once" / "You Give Good Love"
"Superstar" / "Never Too Much" 
"Step by Step"
Medley: "Wishin' and Hopin'" / "Alfie  
Medley: "Heartbreak Hotel" / "It's Not Right But It's Okay"
"My Love Is Your Love"
"I Go to the Rock"
"This Will Be"  
"I Wanna Dance With Somebody (Who Loves Me)"
"How Will I Know"
"Didn't We Almost Have It All" 
"I Will Always Love You"
"I'm Every Woman"
"That's What Friends Are For" 

Notes

Additional notes

Houston's set included a tribute to close friend Luther Vandross, performing his classic tunes "Never Too Much" and "Superstar". Vandross at the time was in a rehabilitation center recovering from a stroke in 2003.
July 7 and 11: Hamburg, and Oberhausen, Whitney and Dionne sang a duet of "Wishin' and Hopin'"; also for the closing finale, "That's What Friends Are For" was performed by Cole, Houston and Warwick.
Additional dates was set in Asia. Due to scheduling conflicts, Houston performed the remaining dates without Dionne Warwick and Natalie Cole. Whitney performed shows in Thailand, China and Hong Kong.
July 19: in Bangkok, Whitney performed "Amazing Grace" followed by "I Go to the Rock".
July 22, 25 and 28: during the shows in Shanghai, Beijing and Hong Kong she performed "The Battle Hymn of the Republic."

Shows

Cancellations and rescheduled shows

External links
 soul divas tour - whitneyhouston
 whitneyhouston.com

References

2004 concert tours
2004 in Germany
Co-headlining concert tours
Dionne Warwick
Whitney Houston concert tours